This article is the rosters of each Japanese 2019–20 V.League Division 1 Men's clubs.

Suntory Sunbirds 
The following is the roster of Suntory Sunbirds in 2019–20 season.

Head coach:  Masaji Ogino

Panasonic Panthers 
The following is the roster of Panasonic Panthers in 2019–20 season.

Head coach:  Mauricio Paes

Wolf Dogs Nagoya 
The following is the roster of Wolf Dogs Nagoya in 2019–20 season.

Head coach:  Tommi Tiilikainen

JTEKT Stings 
The following is the roster of JTEKT Stings in 2019–20 season.

Head coach:  Shinji Takahashi

Toray Arrows 
The following is the roster of Toray Arrows in 2019–20 season.

Head coach:  Shinoda Ayumu

JT Thunders 
The following is the roster of JT Thunders in 2019–20 season.

Head coach:  Tine Sattler

Osaka Blazers Sakai 
The following is the roster of Osaka Blazers Sakai in 2019–20 season.

Head coach:  Gordon Mayforth

FC Tokyo 
The following is the roster of FC Tokyo in 2019–20 season.

Head coach:  Koichiro Shimbo

VC Nagano Tridents 
The following is the roster of VC Nagano Tridents in 2019–20 season.

Head coach:  Ahmad Masajedi

Oita Miyoshi Weisse Adler 
The following is the roster of Oita Miyoshi Weisse Adler in 2019–20 season.

Head coach:  Takashi Ogawa

Notes

References 

V.League Men
V.League Men
Men's
2019 in Japanese sport
2020 in Japanese sport